The Île-de-France tramways is a network of modern tram lines in the Île-de-France region of France. Twelve lines are currently operational (counting Lines T3a and T3b as separate lines), with extensions and additional lines in both construction and planning stages. Although the system mainly runs in the suburban regions of Paris, lines T3a and T3b run entirely within Paris city limits, while line T2 starts its route within Paris' borders. While lines operate independently of each other and are generally unconnected, some connections do exist: between lines T2 and T3a (at the Porte de Versailles station, since 2009), T3a and T3b (at the Porte de Vincennes station, since 2012), T1 and T5 (at the Marché de Saint-Denis station, since 2013), T1 and T8 (at the Saint-Denis train station, since 2014) and T8 and T11 Express (at two stations : Villetaneuse-Université and Épinay-sur-Seine, since 2009). However, the final design of the entire planned tram network is fairly integrated. (The prefix "T" in tram line numbers avoids confusion with the numbering of Paris Métro lines.)

Almost all lines (Lines 4, 9, 11 Express and 13 Express being the sole exceptions) are operated by the Régie Autonome des Transports Parisiens (RATP), which also operates the Paris Métro and most bus services in the Paris immediate area. Furthermore, while most lines use conventional steel-wheel rolling stock, two lines (T5 and T6) use rubber-tired trams. Moreover, line T4, which uses tram-train technology, is operated by the French national rail operator SNCF as part of its Transilien regional rail network. Line T11 Express, which also uses tram-train technology, is operated by SNCF's subsubsidiary Transkeo.

History 

From 1855 to 1938, Paris was served by an extensive tramway network, predating the Paris Métro by nearly a half-century. In 1925 the network had a  length, with 122 lines. In the 1930s, the oil and automobile industry lobbies put pressure on the Paris Police Prefecture to remove tram tracks and make room for cars. The last of these first generation tram lines inside of Paris, connecting Porte de Saint-Cloud to Porte de Vincennes, was closed in 1937, and the last line in the entire Paris agglomeration, running between Le Raincy and Montfermeil, ended its service on 14 August 1938.

Originally horse-powered, Paris trams used steam, as well as later pneumatic engines, then electricity. The funicular that operated in Belleville from 1891 to 1924 is sometimes erroneously thought of as a tramway, but was actually a cable car system. The first of the new generation of trams in Paris, the current Line T1, opened in 1992, with Line T2 opening in 1997 and Lines T3 and T4 in 2006. Lines T5 and T7, opened in 2013 while T6 and T8 opened in 2014. T11 opened in 2017, and T9 opened in 2021. While T10 is currently under construction, as well as Lines T12 Express and T13 Express, the last parts of the former Grande Ceinture Line that are not covered by Line T11 Express.

Lines

T1 

Line T1 currently connects Asnières-sur-Seine and Gennevilliers to Noisy-le-Sec, running almost parallel to the Paris city's northern limit. It opened in 1992 from Saint Denis's RER station to the Bobigny–Pablo Picasso Paris Métro station, where the prefecture offices of the Seine-Saint-Denis department are located. The eastern extension from Bobigny to Noisy-le-Sec was completed in 2003, while the western extension to Asnières-sur-Seine and Gennevilliers, connecting to western branch of Paris Métro Line 13, opened in 2012. A continuation towards Nanterre is planned on the western side, while another one towards Montreuil, then to the Val de Fontenay RER station is also planned on the eastern side of the line.

T2 

Line T2 (Trans Val-de-Seine) connects the bridge of Bezons (Pont de Bezons) to the Porte de Versailles Paris Métro station (near Paris's main exhibit grounds) via La Défense and Issy-les-Moulineaux business districts. It opened in 1997 between La Défense and Issy–Val de Seine stations, exploiting a former SNCF line, the Moulineaux Line, which closed to regular train traffic in 1993. Tram line T2 was first extended south in 2009, from Issy–Val de Seine station to the Porte de Versailles, then north in 2012 from La Défense to the Pont de Bezons.

T3a and T3b 

Line T3 (Tramway des Maréchaux) is the first modern tramway line to actually enter Paris city itself. It is divided into two sections, called T3a and T3b, separated at the Porte de Vincennes stop in order not to cut the road traffic there, despite rail and electrical infrastructure being present and operational. The line bears its name as it follows the Boulevards of the Marshals, a series of boulevards that encircle Paris along the route of the former Thiers Wall, built from 1841 to 1844. The boulevards are, with three exceptions, all named from Napoleon's First Empire marshals (maréchaux).

T3a connects the Pont du Garigliano–Hôpital européen Georges-Pompidou RER station in the southwestern part of the 15th arrondissement, with the Porte de Vincennes in the northeastern corner of the 12th arrondissement. T3b connects Porte de Vincennes with the Porte de la Chapelle Métro station in the 18th arrondissement, then  to the Porte d'Asnières (17th arrondissement) since 24 November 2018. An extension westward towards the Porte Dauphine (16th arrondissement) is planned, but currently halted by western extension of the RER E line.

T4 

It opened on 18 November 2006. Unlike the other tramways in Île-de-France, Line T4 is operated by the SNCF. A new branch of this tram-train line, heading east towards Montfermeil, opened in 2020.

T5

Tramway T5 is a Translohr tram-on-tyres running along a mainly segregated "track" on the busy Route Nationale 1 (similar to the systems in Nancy or Caen) where it replaces the former bus lines 168 and 268. The  route serves 16 stops between Saint-Denis, Pierrefitte-sur-Seine, Sarcelles and Garges-lès-Gonesse. It has an interchange with T1 at its southernmost terminus, Marché de Saint-Denis, and with RER D at its northernmost terminus, the Garges-Sarcelles RER station. Line T5 opened in July 2013.

T6

Tramway Line 6 is a  Translohr tram-on-tyres line serving 21 stations, from the Châtillon–Montrouge Métro station (the southern terminus of Paris Métro Line 13) to the Viroflay-Rive-Droite Transilien station through Vélizy-Villacoublay. The  westernmost part of the line (through Viroflay), is underground, in a single tunnel grossing the town from south to north and including the two final stops, each under the two train stations the city has, Rive-Gauche (Lines C and N) and Rive-Droite (Line L). The majority of the current line opened in 2014, with said tunnel section opening in 2016. It replaced bus line 295, that became overcrowded and too slow for proper use, as well as multiple of the former Kéolis lines operating across Vélizy.

T7

Tramway Line 7 is an  route serving 18 stations between Villejuif–Louis Aragon (southwestern terminus of Paris Métro Line 7) and Athis-Mons, via Rungis International Market and Orly Airport. It opened in 2013 in order to both allow a supplemental rail service from Paris to Orly Airport and replace bus line 285, which had also become overcrowded on its now supplemented part. The remaining part of said bus line is also planned to be replaced by the upcoming southern extension of Tram Line 7 towards the Juvisy-sur-Orge train station.

T8

Formerly known as Tram'y due to its opening-day Y-shape (while T4 got its Y-shape after its initial opening), this  tram line goes from the Saint-Denis–Porte de Paris Métro station to Épinay-sur-Seine — Orgemont, with a branch to the university campus of Villetaneuse, where it connects to the more recent T11 Express Line. An extension is also planned south, to Paris itself, at the Rosa Parks RER station. Construction of the line began in 2010; service began in 2014. The southern extension's opening date has not yet been set.

T9

Despite what its indice digit suggests, it opened after Tram Line 11 express. An extension south towards Orly is planned.

T11 Express

First "Express" tram line of the Parisian network — due to reusing the long-closed Grande Ceinture train line with only a handful of stations — Line T11 Express serves as the first of three lines to cover the former Grande Ceinture rail line and offers eventually a second circular railroad service around Paris, something the Paris public transport system sorely lacked for decades.

Line T11 Express opened in 2017 between the Épinay-sur-Seine and Le Bourget RER stations, the middle part of its expected full route between Sartrouville and Noisy-le-Sec RER stations. This full route project would make T11 the first tram line to connect every RER line currently in service.

T13 Express 

It opened on 6 July 2022. No extensions are planned.

Future lines

T10 

T12 Express 

This part would reclaim the train service between Épinay and Massy currently covered by RER C. An extension of T12 further northwest, towards Versailles-Chantiers, is planned and would take over RER C on the Massy to Versailles portion as well if entered.

Tvm 

The Trans-Val-de-Marne bus line, which runs in a designated BRT corridor (bus rapid transit) and is intended to provide high-capacity, rapid bus transit southeast of Paris in the department of Val-de-Marne, is operated by RATP unlike most suburban bus lines. Despite beginning with a T, it is not a tramway. The RATP however considers it to be part of the T network, and is currently drawing plans for more BRT lines. The Tvm has been certified to be BRT with Silver Excellence in 2014.

Network Map

See also 
 List of tram stops in Île-de-France
 Transportation in Paris
 Trams in France
 List of town tramway systems in France
 List of tram and light rail transit systems

References

External links 

Official RATP website
Official SNCF Transilien website
Comprehensive map of the Paris tram network including track layouts 

 
 Ile-de-France
Rail transport in Île-de-France
Rail transport in Paris
RATP Group
Ile-de-France
Articles containing video clips